Sanglang is a state constituency in Perlis, Malaysia, that has been represented in the Perlis State Legislative Assembly.

The state constituency was created in 1958. It was first contested in 1959 and is mandated to return a single Assemblyman to the Perlis State Legislative Assembly under the first-past-the-post voting system. , the State Assemblyman for Sanglang is Mohd Shukri Ramli from Parti Islam Se-Malaysia (PAS).

Definition

Polling districts 
According to the federal gazette issued on 31 October 2022, the Sanglang constituency is divided into 7 polling districts.

Demographics

History

Election results

References

Perlis state constituencies